Gary Kwok (born June 11, 1966) is best known as a Canadian race driver.

He has raced in the Hong Kong Touring Car Championship, the Canadian Touring Car Championship, the Continental Tire Sports Car Challenge and the Pirelli World Challenge. 

In 2011 he drove for the Wiechers-Sport team in the World Touring Car Championship at Macau.

In 2019 Gary was the Canadian Touring Car Championship TCR class champion.

Career results

Complete World Touring Car Championship results
(key) (Races in bold indicate pole position) (Races in italics indicate fastest lap)

References

 Profile from WTCC website
 

Living people
1966 births
People from Markham, Ontario
Racing drivers from Ontario
World Touring Car Championship drivers